Carneopezizella is a genus of fungi in the family Helotiaceae. This is a monotypic genus, containing the single species Carneopezizella salicicola.

References

External links
Carneopezizella at Index Fungorum

Helotiaceae
Monotypic Ascomycota genera